Ezra Cornell is a monumental statue in Ithaca, New York, United States. Located on the Arts Quad of the Cornell Central Campus, the monument honors Ezra Cornell, the co-founder and namesake of Cornell University. The statue, designed by Hermon Atkins MacNeil, was dedicated in 1919.

History

Background 
Ezra Cornell was born on January 11, 1807, in Westchester County, New York. In 1828, he moved to Ithaca, New York, where he managed a flouring mill and other factories along the Fall Creek. In the 1840s, after becoming acquainted with Samuel Morse, Cornell became involved in the creation of telegraph lines in the Northeastern United States, and in 1855 he founded the Western Union Telegraph Company. Despite retiring in 1858, Cornell remained active in politics and philanthropy. As a Republican, he served on the New York State Assembly and later the New York State Senate throughout the 1860s and established a public library in Ithaca in 1863. During this time, Cornell also became involved in the creation of Cornell University in Ithaca. In 1865, Cornell became the chairman of the Cornell University Board of Trustees, a position he would hold until his death, and he proceeded to help the newly established institution grow by securing its designation as New York's land-grant university and donating  of land and $500,000 in cash. Cornell died in Ithaca on December 9, 1874.

Creation 
The idea for a public statue honoring Ezra Cornell was put forth by students in 1906, with the idea of dedicating it on the centennial of Ezra's birth, but this idea did not come to fruition. In 1915, the Board of Trustees commissioned sculptor Hermon Atkins MacNeil to design a bronze statue honoring their university's namesake. MacNeil, a graduate of the Massachusetts Normal Art School, had taught art classes at Cornell in the 1880s, including "Industrial art" for the university's Sibley College. He had been hired by Robert H. Thurston, the dean of the mechanical engineering program at Cornell, who later encouraged MacNeil to further his training in Europe. The contract for the statue awarded to MacNeil was for $25,000. MacNeil worked on the statue between 1915 and 1917. Speaking later of the statue, MacNeil stated that its construction was a labor of love, because Ezra looked like his father. By 1918, work on the location for the statue was started, and in May, the foundation for the pedestal was placed between Morrill Hall and McGraw Hall. During this work, an old cistern, which used to be part of the university's water system, was uncovered.

Dedication 
The dedication celebrations for the statue was originally set to occur on October 8, 1918, with a military parade and procession to take place as part of semicentennial celebrations for the university. However, World War I caused these celebrations to be postponed. These celebrations were instead rescheduled to June 20–22, 1919, with the university's commencement to be held the day after these celebrations. The statue was officially unveiled on June 22, with Mary Cornell, Ezra's only living child, doing the unveiling. The year after the statue's dedication, images of the monument were displayed at an annual exhibition held by the Architectural League of New York.

Vandalism 
Over the years, the statue has been the subject of occasional acts of vandalism. 
 In 1985, the statue was doused in light-blue paint by Columbia University students following an incident where the scepter of Alma Mater was stolen by Cornell students. 
 In 2017, anti-Semitic posters and fliers were posted on both the statue and several buildings around the campus. 
 In 2020, during nationwide George Floyd protests, the base of the monument was graffitied with the phrase "I can't breathe". The base was later covered prior to its cleanup.

Design 

The monument consists of a bronze statue of Cornell atop a red granite pedestal. On the front of the pedestal is inscribed the following:

The statue depicts Cornell wearing a frock coat, with a wide-brimmed hat in his right hand, which is resting on a walking cane. His left hand rests on a base, on top of which is the charter for the university. At the bottom of this base is an oak sprig. Behind Cornell is a Morse telegraph. Cornell faces across the quad, and the statue is located across the quad from a statue of Andrew Dickson White.

See also 

 1919 in art

References

Bibliography

External links 
 

1919 establishments in New York (state)
1919 sculptures
Bronze sculptures in New York (state)
Cornell University buildings
Outdoor sculptures in New York (state)
Vandalized works of art in New York (state)